Mirosław Ziętarski (born 9 March 1993) is a Polish rower. He competed in the men's quadruple sculls event at the 2016 Summer Olympics.

References

External links

1993 births
Living people
Polish male rowers
Olympic rowers of Poland
Rowers at the 2016 Summer Olympics
Rowers at the 2020 Summer Olympics
World Rowing Championships medalists for Poland
European Rowing Championships medalists
People from Golub-Dobrzyń County
21st-century Polish people